Erynnis zarucco, commonly known as the zarucco duskywing, is a species of butterfly in the family Hesperiidae. It is found (rarely) from southern Ontario to the southeastern United States.

The wingspan is 32–38 mm. There are three generations in the deep south but only two in the north.

The larvae feed on tree and herbaceous Fabaceae.

References

External links
Zarucco Duskywing, Nearctica
Zarucco Duskywing, Jeff's Nature Page

Erynnis
Butterflies described in 1857